Francis Joseph Daly (1884 – 18 February 1950) was an Irish Fianna Fáil politician. He was elected to Dáil Éireann as a Teachta Dála (TD) for the Cork Borough constituency at the 1943 general election, and was re-elected at the 1944 general election. He did not contest the 1948 general election. He served as Lord Mayor of Cork from 1930 to 1932.

References

1884 births
1950 deaths
Fianna Fáil TDs
Members of the 11th Dáil
Members of the 12th Dáil
Lord Mayors of Cork